Terenino is a rural locality (a village) in Chertkovskoye Rural Settlement, Selivanovsky District, Vladimir Oblast, Russia. The population was 32 as of 2010.

Geography 
Terenino is located on the Tetrukh River, 16 km east of Krasnaya Gorbatka (the district's administrative centre) by road. Vikhirevo is the nearest rural locality.

References 

Rural localities in Selivanovsky District